is a passenger railway station located in the city of  Yokosuka, Kanagawa Prefecture, Japan, operated by the private railway company Keikyū.

Lines
Keikyū Taura Station is served by the Keikyū Main Line and is located 44.5 kilometers from the northern terminus of the line at Shinagawa Station in Tokyo.

Station layout
The station consists of two elevated opposed side platforms the station underneath.. The platforms are short, and can only handle six-car long trains.

Platforms

History
It was renamed  on November 1, 1963, and to its present name on June 1, 1987.

Keikyū introduced station numbering to its stations on 21 October 2010; Keikyū Taura Station was assigned station number KK55.

Passenger statistics
In fiscal 2019, the station was used by an average of 12,986 passengers daily. 

The passenger figures for previous years are as shown below.

Surrounding area
 Taura Plum Grove
 Nagaura Port
 JMSDF Yokosuka Base
 Yokosuka City Funakoshi Elementary School

See also
 List of railway stations in Japan

References

External links

 

Railway stations in Kanagawa Prefecture
Keikyū Main Line
Railway stations in Yokosuka, Kanagawa
Railway stations in Japan opened in 1930